The Dutch Eerste Divisie in the 1996–97 season was contested by 18 teams. MVV won the championship.

New entrants
Relegated from the 1995–96 Eredivisie
 Go Ahead Eagles

League standings

Promotion/relegation play-offs
In the promotion/relegation competition, eight entrants (six from this league and two from the Eredivisie) entered in two groups. The group winners were promoted to the Eredivisie.

See also
 1996–97 Eredivisie
 1996–97 KNVB Cup

References
Netherlands - List of final tables (RSSSF)

Eerste Divisie seasons
2
Neth